A fingerboard is a part of a string instrument.

Fingerboard may also refer to:
 Fingerboard (skateboard), a miniature version of a skateboard controlled by the fingers
 Fingerboards, an article of climbing equipment
 Continuum Fingerboard, a continuous pitch performance controller developed by Haken Audio.
 Another name for a ribbon controller for a synthesizer
 Fingerboard, a South African variant of the traditional board game carrom